As formulated by Albert Einstein in 1905, the theory of special relativity was based on two main postulates:
 The principle of relativity — The form of a physical law is the same in any inertial frame.
 The speed of light is constant — In all inertial frames, the speed of light c is the same whether the light is emitted from a source at rest or in motion. (Note this does not apply in non-inertial frames, indeed between accelerating frames the speed of light cannot be constant. Although it can be applied in non-inertial frames if an observer is confined to making local measurements.
There have been various alternative formulations of special relativity over the years.

"Single postulate" approaches

According to some references, the theory of special relativity can be derived from a single postulate: the principle of relativity. This claim can be misleading because actually these formulations rely on various unsaid assumptions such as isotropy and homogeneity of space. The question here is not about the exact number of postulates. The phrase "single postulate" is just used in comparison with the original "two postulate" formulation.  The real question here is whether universal lightspeed can be deduced rather than assumed.

The Lorentz transformations, up to a nonnegative free parameter, can be derived without first postulating the universal lightspeed. Experiment rules out the validity of the Galilean transformations and this means the parameter in the Lorentz transformations is nonzero hence there is a finite maximum speed before anything has been said about light. Combining this with Maxwell's equations shows that light travels at this maximum speed. The numerical value of the parameter in these transformations is determined by experiment, just as the numerical values of the parameter pair c and the permittivity of free space are left to be determined by experiment even when using Einstein's original postulates. When the numerical values in both Einstein's and these other approaches have been found then these different approaches result in the same theory. So the end result of the interlocking trio of theory+Maxwell+experiment is the same either way. This is the sense in which universal lightspeed can be deduced rather than postulated.

For some historical information, see: History of special relativity#Spacetime physics and the section "Lorentz transformation without second postulate" for the approaches of Ignatowski and Frank/Rothe. However, according to Pauli (1921), Resnick (1967), and Miller (1981), those models were insufficient. But the constancy of the speed of light is contained in Maxwell's equations. That section includes the phrase "Ignatowski was forced to recourse to electrodynamics to include the speed of light.". So, the trio of "principle of relativity+Maxwell+numerical values from experiment" gives special relativity and this should be compared with "principle of relativity+second postulate+Maxwell+numerical values from experiment". Since Einstein's 1905 paper is all about electrodynamics he is assuming Maxwell's equations, and the theory isn't practically applicable without numerical values. When compared like with like, from the point of view of asking what is knowable, the second postulate can be deduced. If you restrict your attention to just the standalone theory of relativity then yes you need the postulate. But given all the available knowledge we don't need to postulate it. In other words, different domains of knowledge are overlapping and thus taken together have more information than necessary.

This can be summarized as follows:
Experimental results rule out the validity of the Galiliean transformations.
That just leaves the Lorentz transformations with a finite maximal speed V.
Given a maximal speed V, the only consistent way of combining PofR with Maxwell's equations is to identify Maxwell's parameter : with the aforementioned maximal speed V.
We are now at the same starting point as if we had postulated the constancy of light, so we proceed to develop all the usual results of special relativity.

There are references which discuss in more detail the principle of relativity

Lorentz ether theory 

Hendrik Lorentz and Henri Poincaré developed their version of special relativity in a series of papers from about 1900 to 1905. They used Maxwell's equations and the principle of relativity to deduce a theory that is mathematically equivalent to the theory later developed by Einstein.

Minkowski spacetime

Minkowski space (or Minkowski spacetime) is a mathematical setting in which special relativity is conveniently formulated. Minkowski space is named for the German mathematician Hermann Minkowski, who around 1907 realized that the theory of special relativity (previously developed by Poincaré and Einstein) could be elegantly described using a four-dimensional spacetime, which combines the dimension of time with the three dimensions of space.

Mathematically there are a number of ways in which the four-dimensions of Minkowski spacetime are commonly represented: as a four-vector with 4 real coordinates, as a four-vector with 3 real and one complex coordinate, or using tensors.

Test theories of special relativity

Test theories of special relativity are flat space-time theories which differ from special relativity by having a different postulate about light concerning one-way speed of light vs two-way speed of light. Different postulates on light result in different notions of time simultaneity. There is Robertson's test theory (1949) which predicts different experimental results from Einstein's special relativity, and then there is Edward's theory (1963) which cannot be called a test theory because it is physically equivalent to special relativity, and then there is the Mansouri-Sexl theory (1977) which is equivalent to Robertson's theory.

Curvilinear coordinates and non-inertial frames

Equivalent to the original ? Curvilinear is a generalization, but the original SR can be applied locally.

There can be misunderstandings over the sense in which SR can be applied to accelerating frames.

The confusion here results from trying to describe three different things with just two labels. The three things are:
 A description of physics without gravity using just "inertial frames", i.e. non-accelerating Cartesian coordinate systems. These coordinate systems are all related to each other by the linear Lorentz transformations. The physical laws may be described more simply in these frames than in the others. This is "special relativity" as usually understood.
 A description of physics without gravity using arbitrary curvilinear coordinates. This is non-gravitational physics plus general covariance. Here one sets the Riemann-Christoffel tensor to zero instead of using the Einstein field equations. This is the sense in which "special relativity" can handle accelerated frames.
 A description of physics including gravity governed by the Einstein field equations, i.e. full general relativity.

Special relativity cannot be used to describe a global frame for non-inertial i.e. accelerating frames. However general relativity implies that special relativity can be applied locally where the observer is confined to making local measurements. For example, an analysis of Bremsstrahlung does not require general relativity, SR is sufficient.

The key point is that you can use special relativity to describe all kinds of accelerated phenomena, and also to predict the measurements made by an accelerated observer who's confined to making measurements at one specific location only. If you try to build a complete frame for such an observer, one that is meant to cover all of spacetime, you'll run into difficulties (there'll be a horizon, for one).

The problem is that you cannot derive from the postulates of special relativity that an acceleration will not have a non-trivial effect. E.g. in case of the twin paradox, we know that you can compute the correct answer of the age difference of the twins simply by integrating the formula for time dilation along the trajectory of the travelling twin. This means that one assumes that at any instant, the twin on its trajectory can be replaced by an inertial observer that is moving at the same velocity of the twin. This gives the correct answer, as long as we are computing effects that are local to the travelling twin. The fact that the acceleration that distinguishes the local inertial rest frame of the twin and the true frame of the twin does not have any additional effect follows from general relativity (it has, of course, been verified experimentally).

In 1943, Moller obtained a transform between an inertial frame and a frame moving with constant acceleration, based on Einstein's vacuum eq and a certain postulated time-independent metric tensor, although this transform is of limited applicability as it does not reduce to the Lorentz transform when a=0.

Throughout the 20th century efforts were made in order to generalize the Lorentz transformations to a set of transformations linking inertial frames to non-inertial frames with uniform acceleration. So far, these efforts failed to produce satisfactory results that are both consistent with 4-dimensional symmetry and to reduce in the limit a=0 to the Lorentz transformations. Hsu and Hsu claim that they have finally come up with suitable transformations for constant linear acceleration (uniform acceleration). They call these transformations: Generalized Moller-Wu-Lee Transformations. They also say: "But such a generalization turns out not to be unique from a theoretical viewpoint and there are infinitely many generalizations. So far, no established theoretical principle leads to a simple and unique generalization."

de Sitter relativity

According to the works of Cacciatori, Gorini and Kamenshchik,  and Bacry and Lévi-Leblond and the references therein, if you take Minkowski's ideas to their logical conclusion then not only are boosts non-commutative but translations are also non-commutative. This means that the symmetry group of space time is a de Sitter group rather than the Poincaré group. This results in spacetime being slightly curved even in the absence of matter or energy. This residual curvature is caused by a cosmological constant to be determined by observation. Due to the small magnitude of the constant, then special relativity with the Poincaré group is more than accurate enough for all practical purposes, although near the Big Bang and inflation de Sitter relativity may be more useful due to the cosmological constant being larger back then. Note this is not the same thing as solving Einstein's field equations for general relativity to get a de Sitter Universe, rather the de Sitter relativity is about getting a de Sitter Group for special relativity which neglects gravity.

Taiji relativity

This section is based on the work of Jong-Ping Hsu and Leonardo Hsu.  They decided to use the word Taiji which is a Chinese word meaning the ultimate principles that existed before the creation of the world. In SI units, time is measured in seconds, but taiji time is measured in units of metres — the same units used to measure space. Their arguments about choosing what units to measure time in, lead them to say that they can develop a theory of relativity which is experimentally indistinguishable from special relativity, but without using the second postulate in their derivation. Their claims have been disputed.
The transformations that they derive involve the factor  where β is the velocity measured in metres per metre (a dimensionless quantity). This looks the same as (but should NOT be conceptually confused with) the velocity as a fraction of light v/c that appears in some expressions for the Lorentz transformations. Expressing time in metres has previously been done by other authors: Taylor and Wheeler in Spacetime Physics and Moore in Six Ideas that Shaped Physics.

The transformations are derived using just the principle of relativity and have a maximal speed of 1, which is quite unlike "single postulate" derivations of the Lorentz transformations in which you end up with a parameter that may be zero. So this is not the same as other "single postulate" derivations. However the relationship of taiji time "w" to standard time "t" must still be found, otherwise it would not be clear how an observer would measure taiji time. The taiji transformations are then combined with Maxwell's equations to show that the speed of light is independent of the observer and has the value 1 in taiji speed (i.e. it has the maximal speed). This can be thought of as saying: a time of 1 metre is the time it takes for light to travel 1 metre. Since we can measure the speed of light by experiment in m/s to get the value c, we can use this as a conversion factor. i.e. we have now found an operational definition of taiji time: w=ct.

So we have: w metres = (c m/s) * t seconds
Let r = distance. Then taiji speed = r metres / w metres = r/w dimensionless.

But it is not just due to the choice of units that there is a maximum speed. It is the principle of relativity, that Hsu & Hsu say, when applied to 4d spacetime, implies the invariance of the 4d-spacetime interval  and this leads to the coordinate transformations involving the factor  where beta is the magnitude of the velocity between two inertial frames. The difference between this and the spacetime interval  in Minkowski space is that  is invariant purely by the principle of relativity whereas  requires both postulates.
The "principle of relativity" in spacetime is taken to mean invariance of laws under 4-dimensional transformations.

Hsu & Hsu then explore other relationships between w and t such as w=bt where b is a function. They show that there are versions of relativity which are consistent with experiment but have a definition of time where the "speed" of light is not constant. They develop one such version called common relativity which is more convenient for performing calculations for "relativistic many body problems" than using special relativity.

Euclidean relativity

Euclidean relativity

 uses a Euclidean (++++) metric in four-dimensional Euclidean space as opposed to the traditional Minkowski (+---) or (-+++) metric in four-dimensional space-time. The Euclidean metric is derived from the Minkowski metric by rewriting  into the equivalent . The roles of time t and proper time  have switched so that proper time  takes the role of the coordinate for the 4th spatial dimension. A universal velocity  for all objects moving through four-dimensional space appears from the regular time derivative . The approach differs from the so-called Wick rotation or complex Euclidean relativity. Because  implies that photons travel at the speed of light in the subspace {x, y, z} and baryonic matter that is at rest in  {x, y, z} travels normal to photons along , a paradox arises on how photons can be propagated in a space-time. The possible existence of parallel space-times or parallel worlds shifted and co-moving along  is the approach of Giorgio Fontana. The Euclidean geometry is consistent with classical, Minkowski based relativity. The hyperbolic Minkowski geometry turns into a rotation in 4D circular geometry where length contraction and time dilation result from the geometric projection of 4D properties to 3D space.

Very special relativity

Ignoring gravity, experimental bounds seem to suggest that special relativity with its Lorentz symmetry and Poincaré symmetry describes spacetime. Surprisingly, Cohen and Glashow 
have demonstrated that a small subgroup of the Lorentz group is sufficient to explain all the current bounds.

The minimal subgroup in question can be described as follows: The stabilizer of a null vector is the special Euclidean group SE(2), which contains T(2) as the subgroup of parabolic transformations. This T(2), when extended to include either parity or time reversal (i.e. subgroups of the orthochronous and time-reversal respectively), is sufficient to give us all the standard predictions. Their new symmetry is called Very Special Relativity (VSR).

Doubly special relativity

Doubly special relativity (DSR) is a modified theory of special relativity in which there is not only an observer-independent maximum velocity (the speed of light), but an observer-independent minimum length (the Planck length).

The motivation to these proposals is mainly theoretical, based on the following observation: The Planck length is expected to play a fundamental role in a theory of Quantum Gravity, setting the scale at which Quantum Gravity effects cannot be neglected and new phenomena are observed. If Special Relativity is to hold up exactly to this scale, different observers would observe Quantum Gravity effects at different scales, due to the Lorentz–FitzGerald contraction, in contradiction to the principle that all inertial observers should be able to describe phenomena by the same physical laws.

A drawback of the usual doubly special relativity models is that they are valid only at the energy scales where ordinary special relativity is supposed to break down, giving rise to a patchwork relativity. On the other hand, de Sitter relativity is found to be invariant under a simultaneous re-scaling of mass, energy and momentum, and is consequently valid at all energy scales.

Notes

References

Special relativity